Andrey Kolesnik (born February 26, 1960, Kaliningrad) is a Russian political figure and deputy of the 6th and 8th State Dumas.

Career 
Until 1991, Kolesnik served as a naval navigator at the Baltic Fleet. In 1991, due to an injury, he started teaching at the Baltic Naval Institute. From the 1990s and till 2011, he was the chairman of the board of directors of the Kaliningrad Port. From March to December 2011, he was the deputy of the district council of Kaliningrad, representing United Russia. From 2011 to 2016, he was the deputy of the 6th State Duma from the Kaliningrad Oblast constituency; simultaneously, he acted as a secretary of the regional branch of the United Russia. In 2018–2021, he was the deputy of the Kaliningrad Oblast Duma. Since 2021, he was re-elected deputy of the 8th State Duma.

In December 2021, Kolesnik participated in a group brawl that took place among deputies of the State Duma during the discussion of the bill on QR codes.

References

1960 births
Living people
United Russia politicians
21st-century Russian politicians
Eighth convocation members of the State Duma (Russian Federation)
Sixth convocation members of the State Duma (Russian Federation)